Square One may refer to:

Film and TV 
 Square One: Michael Jackson, a 2019 investigative documentary about the first allegations of child sexual abuse brought by the Chandler family
Square One Television, a children's television series about math
Square One (game show), a British game show
 Square One (film), a 1997 Australian film

Music
 Square One (band), a 1990s Barbados-based soca band
Square One (M-Flo album), a 2012 album by Japanese artist M-Flo
Square One (single album), 2016 single album of South Korean girl group Blackpink 
 "Square One" (song), a 2006 song by Tom Petty
 Square 1, a 2003 album by Irish singer-songwriter David Kitt
 "Square One", a 2005 song by Coldplay from their album, X&Y

Other uses
Square One Bus Terminal, an intercity bus terminal in Mississauga, Ontario, Canada
Square One Mall, a shopping mall in Saugus, Massachusetts, United States
Square One Organic Vodka, an artisanal organic spirit
Square One Publishers, a book publishing company
Square One Shopping Centre, a shopping mall in Mississauga, Ontario, Canada
Square One Studios, a US mobile game developer which operated from 2010-2011
Square-1 (puzzle), a variant of the Rubik's Cube
Square One, play by Nigel Williams
Square One, an unproduced stage musical by Stephen Sondheim

See also
 Back to square one (disambiguation)